The Chicago "L" (short for "elevated") is the rapid transit system serving the city of Chicago and some of its surrounding suburbs in the U.S. state of Illinois. In 2016, the "L" had 1,492 rail cars, eight different routes, and 145 train stations.

The "L" provides 24-hour service on the Red and Blue Lines and is one of only five rapid transit systems in the United States to do so. The oldest sections of the "L" started operations in 1892, making it the second-oldest rapid transit system in the Americas, after New York City's elevated lines.

The "L" has been credited for fostering the growth of Chicago's dense city core that is one of the city's distinguishing features. It consists of eight rapid transit lines laid out in a spoke–hub distribution paradigm focusing transit towards the Loop. The "L" gained its name because large parts of the system run on elevated track. Portions of the network are in subway tunnels, at grade level, or in open cuts.

In a 2005 poll, Chicago Tribune readers voted it one of the "seven wonders of Chicago", behind the lakefront and Wrigley Field, and ahead of Willis Tower (formerly the Sears Tower), the Water Tower, the University of Chicago, and the Museum of Science and Industry.

History

Pre-CTA era 
The first "L", the Chicago and South Side Rapid Transit Railroad, began revenue service on June 6, 1892, when a steam locomotive pulling four wooden coaches, carrying more than a couple of dozen people, departed the 39th Street station and arrived at the Congress Street Terminal 14 minutes later, over tracks that are still in use by the Green Line. Over the next year, service was extended to 63rd Street and Stony Island Avenue, then the Transportation Building of the World's Columbian Exposition in Jackson Park.

In 1893, trains began running on the Lake Street Elevated Railroad and in 1895 on the Metropolitan West Side Elevated, which had lines to Douglas Park, Garfield Park (since replaced), Humboldt Park (since demolished), and Logan Square. The Metropolitan was the United States' first non-exhibition rapid transit system powered by electric traction motors, a technology whose practicality had been demonstrated in 1890 on the "intramural railway" at the World Fair that had been held in Chicago. Two years later the South Side "L" introduced multiple-unit control, in which the operator can control all the motorized cars in a train, not just the lead unit. Electrification and MU control remain standard features of most of the world's rapid transit systems.

A drawback of early "L" service was that none of the lines entered the central business district. Instead trains dropped passengers at stub terminals on the periphery due to a state law at the time requiring approval by neighboring property owners for tracks built over public streets, something not easily obtained downtown. This obstacle was overcome by the legendary traction magnate Charles Tyson Yerkes, who went on to play a pivotal role in the development of the London Underground, and who was immortalized by Theodore Dreiser as the ruthless schemer Frank Cowperwood in The Titan (1914) and other novels.

Yerkes, who controlled much of the city's streetcar system, obtained the necessary signatures through cash and guile—at one point he secured a franchise to build a mile-long "L" over Van Buren Street from Wabash Avenue to Halsted Street, extracting the requisite majority from the pliable owners on the western half of the route, then building tracks chiefly over the eastern half, where property owners had opposed him. Designed by noted bridge builder John Alexander Low Waddell, the elevated tracks used a multiple close-rivet system to withstand the forces of the passing trains' kinetic energy. 

The Union Loop opened in 1897 and greatly increased the rapid transit system's convenience. Operation on the Yerkes-owned Northwestern Elevated, which built the North Side "L" lines, began three years later, essentially completing the elevated infrastructure in the urban core although extensions and branches continued to be constructed in outlying areas through the 1920s.

After 1911, the "L" lines came under the control of Samuel Insull, president of the Chicago Edison electric utility (now Commonwealth Edison), whose interest stemmed initially from the fact that the trains were the city's largest consumer of electricity. Insull instituted many improvements, including free transfers and through routing, although he did not formally combine the original firms into the Chicago Rapid Transit Company until 1924. He also bought three other Chicago electrified railroads, the Chicago North Shore and Milwaukee Railroad, Chicago Aurora and Elgin Railroad, and South Shore interurban lines, and ran the trains of the first two into downtown Chicago via the "L" tracks.

This period of relative prosperity ended when Insull's empire collapsed in 1932, but later in the decade the city with the help of the federal government accumulated sufficient funds to begin construction of two subway lines to supplement and, some hoped, permit eventual replacement of the Loop elevated; as early as the 1920s some city leaders wanted to replace the "ugly" elevated tracks and these plans advanced in the 1970s under mayors Richard J. Daley and Michael Bilandic until a public outcry against tearing down the popular "L" began, led by Chicago Tribune columnist Paul Gapp, and architect Harry Weese. Instead, then new Mayor Jane Byrne protected the elevated lines and directed their rehabilitation.

The State Street subway opened on October 17, 1943. The Dearborn Subway, on which work had been suspended during World War II, opened on February 25, 1951. The subways were constructed with a secondary purpose of serving as bomb shelters, as evidenced by the close spacing of the support columns (a more extensive plan proposed replacing the entire elevated system with subways). The subways bypassed a number of tight curves and circuitous routings on the original elevated lines (Milwaukee trains, for example, originated on Chicago's northwest side but entered the Loop at the southwest corner), speeding service for many riders.

Gallery

CTA assumes control 

By the 1940s, the financial condition of the "L", and of Chicago mass transit in general, had become too precarious to permit continued operation without subsidies, and the necessary steps were taken to enable a public takeover. In 1947, the Chicago Transit Authority (CTA) acquired the assets of the Chicago Rapid Transit Company and the Chicago Surface Lines, operator of the city's streetcars. Over the next few years CTA modernized the "L", replacing wooden cars with new steel ones and closing lightly used branch lines and stations, many of which had been spaced only a quarter-mile apart.

The CTA introduced fare cards for the first time in 1997. Rail service to the O'Hare International Airport first opened in 1984 and to the Midway International Airport in 1993. That same year, the CTA renamed all of its railways; they are now identified by color.

Skip-stop service 

Later, after assuming control of the "L", the CTA introduced A/B skip-stop service. Under this service, trains were designated as either "A" or "B" trains, and stations were alternately designated as "A" stations or "B" stations, with heavily used stations designated as both – "AB". "A" trains would stop only at "A" and "AB" stations, and "B" trains would stop only at "B" and "AB" stations. 

Station signage carried the station's skip-stop letter and was also color-coded by skip-stop type; "A" stations had red signage, "B" stations had green signage, and "AB" stations had blue signage. The system was designed to speed up lines by having trains skip stations while still allowing for frequent service at the heavily used "AB" stations.

A/B skip-stop service debuted on the Lake Street Elevated in 1948, and the service proved effective as travel times were cut by a third. By the 1950s, the service was used throughout the system. All lines used the A/B skip-stop service between the 1950s and the 1990s with the exception of the Evanston and Skokie lines, which were suburban-only lines and did not justify skip-stop service. 

On the lines with branches, skip-stop service sent all "A" trains to one branch and "B" trains to another branch. On what became the Blue Line, "A" trains were routed on the Congress branch while "B" trains were sent to the Douglas branch. 

On the North-South Line, "A" trains went to the Englewood branch and "B" trains went to the Jackson Park branch. In both cases, individual stops were not skipped beyond the points where those branches diverged. As time went by, the time periods which employed skip-stop service gradually decreased, as the waits at "A" and "B" stations became increasingly longer during non-peak service.

By the 1990s, use of the A/B skip-stop system was only used during rush hour service. Another problem was that trains skipping stations to save time still could not pass the train that was directly ahead, so skipping stations was not advantageous in all regards. In 1993, the CTA began to eliminate skip-stop service when it switched the southern branches of the West-South and North-South Lines to improve rider efficiency, creating the current Red and Green Lines. From this point, Green Line trains made all stops along the entire route, while Red Line trains stopped at all stations south of Harrison. The elimination of A/B skip-stop service continued with the opening of the all-stop Orange Line and the conversion of the Brown Line to all-stop service. 

In April 1995, the last of the A/B skip-stop system was eliminated with the conversion of the O'Hare branch of the Blue Line and the Howard branch of the Red Line to all-stop service. The removal of skip-stop service resulted in some increases in travel times, and greatly increased ridership at former "A" and "B" stations due to increased train frequencies. Station signage highlighting the former skip-stop patterns would remain into the 2000s, when it was gradually replaced across the system.

New rolling stock 
The first air-conditioned cars were introduced in 1964. The last pre–World War II cars were retired in 1973. New lines were built in expressway medians, a technique implemented in Chicago and followed by other cities worldwide. The Congress branch, built in the median of the Eisenhower Expressway, replaced the Garfield Park "L" in 1958. The Dan Ryan branch, built in the median of the Dan Ryan Expressway, opened on September 28, 1969, followed by an extension of the Milwaukee elevated into the Kennedy Expressway in 1970.

The "L" today 

Ridership 

Ridership has been growing steadily after the CTA takeover despite declining mass transit usage nationwide, with an average of 594,000 riders boarding each weekday in 1960 and 759,866 in 2016 (or 47% of all CTA rides). Due to the Loop Flood in April 1992, ridership was at 418,000 that year because CTA was forced to suspend operation for several weeks in both the State and Dearborn subways, used by the most heavily traveled lines.

Growing ridership has not been uniformly distributed. Use of North Side lines is heavy and continues to grow, while that of West Side and South Side lines tend to remain stable. Ridership on the North Side Brown Line, for instance, has increased 83% since 1979, necessitating a station reconstruction project to accommodate even longer trains.

Annual traffic on the Howard branch of the Red Line, which reached 38.7 million in 2010 and 40.9 million in 2011, has exceeded the 1927 prewar peak of 38.5 million. The section of the Blue Line between the Loop and Logan Square, which serves once-neglected but now bustling neighborhoods such as Wicker Park, Bucktown, and Palmer Square, has seen a 54% increase in weekday riders since 1992. On the other hand, weekday ridership on the South Side portion of the Green Line, which closed for two years for reconstruction from January 1994 to May 1996, was 50,400 in 1978 but only 13,000 in 2006. 

Boardings at the 95th/Dan Ryan stop on the Red Line, though still among the system's busiest at 11,100 riders per weekday as of February 2015, are less than half the peak volume in the 1980s. In 1976, three North Side "L" branches – what were then known as the Howard, Milwaukee, and Ravenswood lines − accounted for 42% of non-downtown boardings. Today (with the help of the Blue Line extension to O'Hare), they account for 58%.

The North Side, which has historically been the highest density area of the city, skew no doubt reflects the Chicago building boom between 2000 and 2010, which has focused primarily on North Side neighborhoods and downtown. It may ease somewhat in the wake of the current high level of residential construction along the south lakefront. For example, ridership at the linked Roosevelt stops on the Green, Orange, and Red Lines, which serve the burgeoning South Loop neighborhood, has tripled since 1992, with an average of 8,000 boardings per weekday. 

Patronage at the Cermak-Chinatown stop on the Red Line, with 4,000 weekday boardings, is at the highest level since the station opened in 1969. The 2003 Chicago Central Area Plan proposed construction of a Green Line station at Cermak, between Chinatown and the McCormick Place convention center, in expectation of continued density growth in the vicinity. This station opened in 2015.

Service 
Currently, with the exception of the Red Line and the Blue Line, all lines operate at all times except late nights. Prior to 1998, the Green Line, the Purple Line and the Douglas branch of the Blue Line (the modern-day Pink Line) also had 24 hour service. In the years of private ownership, the South Side Elevated Railroad (now the South Side Elevated portion of the Green Line) provided 24 hour service, a major advantage when compared to Chicago's cable railroads which required daily overnight shutdown for cable maintenance.

Fares 
In 2015, the CTA introduced a new fare payment system called Ventra. Ventra enables passengers to purchase individual tickets, passes, or transit value online, by smart phone, or at participating retail locations. Ventra also works with CTA buses, Pace (suburban buses), and Metra (commuter rail). Payment by a smartphone app, the Ventra app, or by a contactless bankcard is possible.

, the "L" uses a flat fare of $2.50 for almost the entire system, the only exception being O'Hare International Airport on the Blue Line, at which passengers entering the station are charged a higher fare of $5.00 (passengers leaving the system at this station are not charged this higher fare). The higher fare is being charged for what the CTA considers "premium-level" service to O'Hare.  Use of the Midway International Airport Station does not require this higher fare; it only requires the $2.50 regular fare. 

The higher charge at O'Hare has been the source of some controversy in recent years, because of the CTA's plan to eliminate the exemption from the premium fare for airport workers, Transportation Security Administration workers, and airline workers. After protests from those groups, the CTA extended the exemptions for six months.

Lines 

Since 1993, "L" lines have been officially identified by color, although older route names survive to some extent in CTA publications and popular usage to distinguish branches of longer lines. Stations are found throughout Chicago, as well as in the suburbs of Forest Park, Oak Park, Evanston, Wilmette, Cicero, Rosemont, and Skokie.

  Blue Line, consisting of the O'Hare, Milwaukee-Dearborn Subway, and Congress branches The Blue Line extends from O'Hare International Airport through the Loop via the Milwaukee-Dearborn subway to the West Side. Trains travel to Des Plaines Avenue in Forest Park via the Eisenhower Expressway median. The number of stations is 33. Until 1970, the northern section of the Blue Line terminated at Logan Square. During that time, the line was called the Milwaukee route after Milwaukee Avenue, which ran parallel to it; in that year service was extended to Jefferson Park via the Kennedy Expressway median, and in 1984 to O'Hare. The Blue Line is the second-busiest, with 176,120 weekday boardings. It operates 24 hours a day, 7 days a week.

  Brown Line or Ravenswood Line  The Brown Line follows an  route, between the Kimball terminal in Albany Park and the Loop in downtown Chicago. In 2013, the Brown Line had an average weekday ridership of 108,529.

  Green Line, consisting of the Lake Street Elevated, South Side Main Line, and Ashland and East 63rd branches A completely elevated route utilizing the system's oldest segments (dating back to 1892), the Green Line extends  with 30 stops between Forest Park and Oak Park (Harlem/Lake), through The Loop, to the South Side. South of the Garfield station the line splits into two branches, with trains terminating at Ashland/63rd in West Englewood and terminating at Cottage Grove/63rd in Woodlawn. The East 63rd branch formerly extended to Jackson Park, but the portion of the line east of Cottage Grove, which ran above 63rd Street, was demolished in the 1980s and 1997 due to structural problems and was never rebuilt due to community demands. The average number of weekday boardings in 2013 was 68,230.

It runs from a station adjacent to Midway International Airport on the Southwest Side to The Loop in downtown Chicago. Average weekday ridership in 2013 was 58,765.

  Pink Line consisting of the Cermak Branch and Paulina Connector The Pink Line is an  rerouting of former Blue Line branch trains from 54th/Cermak in Cicero via the previously non-revenue Paulina Connector and the Green Line on Lake Street to the Loop. Its average weekday ridership in 2013 was 31,572. In 1952, service on the portion of the line west of 54th Avenue was closed and over the next decade the stations and tracks were demolished. The street level right-of-way is used to this day as parking, locally known as the ""L" Strip".

  Purple Line, consisting of the Evanston Shuttle and Evanston Express The Purple Line is a  branch serving north suburban Evanston and Wilmette with express service to the Loop during weekday rush hours. The local service operates from the Linden terminal in Wilmette through Evanston to the Howard terminal on the north side of Chicago where it connects with the Red and Yellow lines. The weekday rush hour express service continues from Howard to the Loop, running nonstop on the four-track line used by the Red Line to Wilson station, then serving Belmont station, followed by all Brown Line stops to the Loop. 2013 average weekday ridership was 42,673 passenger boardings. The stops from Belmont to Chicago Avenue were added in the 1990s to relieve crowding on the Red and Brown lines. The name "purple line" is a reference to nearby Northwestern University, with four stops (Davis, Foster, Noyes, and Central) located just two blocks west of the university campus.

  Red Line, consisting of the North Side Main Line, State Street subway, and Dan Ryan Branch The Red Line is the busiest route, with 234,232 passenger boardings on an average weekday in 2013. It includes 33 stations on its  route, traveling from the Howard terminal on the city's north side, through downtown Chicago via the State Street subway, then down the Dan Ryan Expressway median to 95th/Dan Ryan on the South Side. Despite its length, the Red Line stops  short of the city's southern border. Extension plans to 130th are currently being considered. The Red Line is one of two lines operating 24 hours a day, seven days a week and is the only CTA "L" line that goes to both Wrigley Field and Guaranteed Rate Field, the homes of Chicago's Major League Baseball teams, the Chicago Cubs and Chicago White Sox. Rail cars are stored at the Howard Yard on the north end of the line and at the 98th Yard at the south end.

  Yellow Line, or Skokie Swift The Yellow Line is a  three station line that runs from the Howard Street terminal to Skokie terminal in north suburban Skokie. The Yellow Line is the only "L" route that does not provide direct service to the Loop. This line was originally part of the North Shore Line's rail service, and was acquired by the CTA in the 1960s. The Yellow Line previously operated as a nonstop shuttle, until the downtown Skokie station Oakton–Skokie opened on April 30, 2012. Other plans in consideration are to extend the line from its current Dempster Street terminus to Old Orchard via an elevated right of way and the construction of an infill station in Evanston. Its average weekday ridership in 2013 was 6,338 passenger boardings.

 The Loop Brown, Green, Orange, Pink, and Purple Line Express trains serve downtown Chicago via the Loop elevated. The Loop's eight stations average 72,843 weekday boardings. The Orange Line, Purple Line and the Pink Line run clockwise, the Brown Line runs counter-clockwise. The Green Line is the Loop's only through service; the other four lines circle the Loop and return to their starting points. The loop crossing at Lake and Wells has been described in the Guinness Book of World Records as the world's busiest railroad crossing.

Rolling stock 

The CTA operates over 1,350 "L" cars, divided among three series, some of which are permanently coupled into married pairs. All cars on the system utilize 600-volt direct current power delivered through a third rail.

The 2600-series was built from 1981 until 1987 by the Budd Company of Philadelphia, Pennsylvania. After the completion of the order of the 2600-series cars, Budd changed its name to Transit America and ceased production of railcars. With 509 cars in operation, the 2600-series is the largest of the three series of "L" cars in operation. The cars were rebuilt by Alstom of Hornell, New York, from 1999 until 2002.

The 3200-series, was built from 1992 until 1994 by Morrison-Knudsen of Hornell, New York. These cars have fluted, stainless steel sides similar to the now-retired 2200-series.

Currently the newest series of CTA rapid transit fleet, the 5000-series train cars are equipped with AC propulsion; interior security cameras; aisle-facing seating, which allow for greater passenger capacity; LED destination signs, interior readouts, and interior maps; GPS; glow-in-the-dark evacuation signs; operator-controlled ventilation systems; among other features. AC propulsion allows for smoother acceleration, lower operational costs, less wear and tear, and greater energy efficiency. For DC propulsion, braking essentially means converting the excess kinetic energy into heat. AC propulsion can take advantage of regenerative braking, meaning the train returns excess energy to the third rail as it slows down.

The future train cars, the 7000-series, have been ordered. Each 7000-series rail car will feature LEDs, 37 to 38 seats, and is a hybrid of the 3200-series and 5000-series. The design and arrangement of seats were modified to improve ergonomics and increase leg room. Enhanced air conditioning will circulate air more efficiently during hot summer days. Laser sensors above the doors will count the number of passengers, allowing the CTA to track passenger volumes and change its schedules accordingly. 

State-owned manufacturer CRRC Sifang America (China Rail Rolling Stock Corporation) won the contract, besting the other major competitor, Bombardier from Canada by $226 million. Concerns have been raised over possible malware, cyber attacks, and mass surveillance by the Chinese government. The computer and software components and the automatic train control system will be made by U.S. and Canadian firms. 

The contract requires ten prototypes to be delivered by October 2019. If the rail cars prove to be acceptable, then full production cars would be delivered starting in October 2020, at a rate of 10 cars per month. The base order is for 400 cars and will be used to replace the 2600-series cars. If the CTA ordered the additional 446 cars, they would replace the 3200-series cars.

Nickname 
Chicago's rapid-transit system is officially nicknamed the "L". This name for the CTA rail system applies to the whole system: its elevated, subway, at-grade, and open-cut segments. The use of the nickname dates from the earliest days of the elevated railroads. Newspapers of the late 1880s referred to proposed elevated railroads in Chicago as L' roads." The first route to be constructed, the Chicago and South Side Rapid Transit Railroad gained the nickname "Alley Elevated", or "Alley L" during its planning and construction, a term that was widely used by 1893, less than a year after the line opened.

In discussing various stylings of "Loop" and "L" in Destination Loop: The Story of Rapid Transit Railroading in and around Chicago (1982), author Brian J. Cudahy quotes a passage from The Neon Wilderness (1947) by Chicago author Nelson Algren: "beneath the curved steel of the El, beneath the endless ties." Cudahy then comments, "Note that in the quotation above ... it says 'El' to mean 'elevated rapid transit railroad.' We trust that this usage can be ascribed to a publisher's editor in New York or some other east coast city; in Chicago the same expression is routinely rendered 'L'."

As used by CTA, the name is rendered as the capital letter 'L', in single quotation marks. "L" (with double quotation marks) was often used by CTA predecessors such as the Chicago Rapid Transit Company; however, the CTA uses single quotation marks (') on some printed materials and signs rather than double. In Chicago, the term "subway" only applies to the State Street and Milwaukee–Dearborn subways and is not applied to the entire system as a whole, as in New York City where both the elevated and underground portions make up the New York City Subway.

Renovation and expansion plans 

Like other large and aging rapid transit systems, the Chicago "L" faces problems of delays, breakdowns, and a multi-billion-dollar backlog of deferred maintenance.

The CTA is currently focused on eliminating slow zones, modernizing the Red, Blue, and Purple lines, and improving "L" stations. In addition, CTA has studied numerous other proposals for expanded rail service and renovations, some of which may be implemented in the future.

Recent service improvements and capital projects

2000–2010 
During the 2000s and 2010s, the CTA has completed several renovation and new construction projects.

Pink Line service began on June 25, 2006, though it did not include any new tracks or stations. The Pink Line travels over what was formerly a branch of the Blue Line from the 54th/Cermak terminal in Cicero to the Polk station in Chicago. Pink Line trains then proceed via the Paulina Connector to the Lake Street branch of the Green Line and then clockwise around the Loop elevated via Lake-Wabash-Van Buren-Wells. Douglas trains used the same route between April 4, 1954, and June 22, 1958, after the old Garfield Park "L" line was demolished to make way for the Eisenhower Expressway. The new route, which serves 22 stations, offered more frequent service for riders on both the Congress and Douglas branches. Pink Line trains could be scheduled independently of Blue Line trains, and ran more frequently than the Douglas branch of the Blue Line did.

In late 2007, trains were forced to operate at reduced speed over more than 22% of the system due to deteriorated track, structure, and other problems. By October 2008, system-wide slow zones had been reduced to 9.1% and by January 2010, total slow zones were reduced to 6.3%. CTA's Slow Zone Elimination Project is an ongoing effort to restore track work to conditions where trains no longer have to reduce speeds through deteriorating areas. The Loop received track work in 2012–2013.  The Purple Line in Evanston received track work and viaduct replacement in 2011–2013.  The Green Line Ashland branch received track work in 2013, prior to the Red Line Dan Ryan branch reconstruction.

The Brown Line Capacity Expansion Project enabled CTA to run eight-car trains on the Brown Line, and rebuilt stations to modern standards, including handicap accessibility. Before the project, Brown Line platforms could only accommodate six-car trains, and increasing ridership led to uncomfortably crowded trains. After several years of construction, eight-car trains began to run at rush hour on the Brown Line in April 2008. The project was completed in December 2009, on time and on budget, with only minor punch list work remaining. The project's total cost was expected to be around $530 million.

2010–present 
While various mayors of Chicago had recognized the importance of reliable public transit, Rahm Emanuel received credit for making improving service a top priority. In addition to local funding, he managed to secure federal dollars by lobbying.

One of the largest reconstruction projects in the CTA's history, at a cost of $425 million, was the Red Line South reconstruction project. From May 19, 2013, through October 20, 2013, the project closed and rebuilt the entire Dan Ryan branch—replacing and rebuilding all the tracks, ties, ballast and drainage systems—from Cermak-Chinatown to 95th/Dan Ryan. The station work involved renewing and improving eight stations, including new paint and lights, bus bridge improvements, new elevators at the Garfield, 63rd, and 87th stations and new roofs and canopies at some stations. "We are looking forward to providing our south Red Line customers with improved stations that are cleaner, brighter and better than they have been in years," said CTA President Forrest Claypool. Shutting down a portion of the railway instead of relegating work to the weekends enabled the project to be completed in months rather than years.

In 2014, the CTA initiated station and track upgrades on the Blue Line between Grand and O'Hare. This $492-million project will result in modernized stations (some of which were originally built in 1895), rebuilt tracks, station platform replacement, subway water management, subway station water infiltration remediation, and improved access to some stations (by adding elevators). This project, scheduled for completion in 2021, is expected to cut travel time between the Loop and O'Hare by ten minutes.

In late 2015, extensive 4G wireless coverage was added to both Blue and Red Line subways, with the $32.5 million installation cost paid for by T-Mobile, Sprint, AT&T and Verizon. Besides adding to passenger convenience, it also improved security by allowing CTA personnel and first responders to communicate more easily in case of an emergency.

The new Wilson Station officially reopened in October 2017. The century-old station now includes accessible elevators, escalators, new security cameras, three entrances, wider stairwells, additional turnstiles, larger platforms, new lights and signage, as well as bus and train trackers.

FastTracks is a program intended to address the slow zones and to make train rides smoother and more reliable. In order to achieve this, crews would replace worn tracks, rail tires, and ballasts. An upgraded power system along the O'Hare Blue Line branch would enable more trains to operate during peak periods. The Blue, Brown, Green, and Red lines would be worked on. This program was set to begin in early 2018 and would continue through 2021. Funding for this $179 million project comes from a fee increase imposed on mobile app-based vehicle for hire companies in Chicago, the first of its kind in the country. In Mayor Emanuel's 2018 budget proposal, the fee went from 52 cents to 67 cents per trip. First introduced in 2015, this fee rose by another five cents in 2019.

In December 2018, The CTA Board approved $2.1 billion worth of contracts for the modernization of the Red and Purple Lines. The largest and most expensive in CTA history, this project includes the construction of a bypass that allows Brown Line trains to travel above Red and Purple Line trains on the city's North Side, and the reconstruction of the Lawrence, Argyle, Berwyn, and Bryn Mawr stations. Construction of the project began on October 2, 2019, and is scheduled for completion in 2025. $100 million in federal funding for the reconstruction of the Red Line was approved September 2019. In the final days of the Barack Obama administration, the federal government agreed to provide $957 million in funding in total; the rest would come from a tax hike on property owners who lived within  of the Red Line.

Planned project 
This new rail service proposal under active consideration by CTA is currently undergoing Alternatives Analysis Studies.

These studies are the first step in a five-step process. This process is required by the Federal New Starts program, which is an essential source of funding for CTA's expansion projects. CTA uses a series of "Screens" to develop a "Locally Preferred Alternative", which is submitted to the federal New Starts program.

Red Line extension 
An extension of the Red Line would provide service from the current terminus at 95th/Dan Ryan to 130th Street, decreasing transit times for Far South Side residents and relieving crowding and congestion at the current terminus, and will fill a transit desert on the Far South Side. CTA presented its locally preferred alternative at meetings in 2009. This consists of a new elevated rail line between 95th/Dan Ryan and a new terminal station at 130th Street, paralleling the Union Pacific Railroad and the South Shore Line through the Far South Side neighborhoods of Roseland, Washington Heights, West Pullman, and Riverdale.

In addition to the terminal station at 130th, three new stations would be built at 103rd, 111th, and Michigan. Basic engineering, along with an environmental impact statement, were underway in 2010. Alignment commenting was opened in 2016. The CTA announced the route,  in length, and four new stations on January 26, 2018, and if the CTA can get the funding for the $3.6 billion extension, construction on the extension would begin in 2025 and would be completed in 2029. Contracts for preliminary work were approved in December 2018.

Previously studied projects 
These projects are currently not being pursued by the CTA because of the cost and the concerns of residents.

Circle Line 
The proposed Circle Line would form an "outer loop", traversing downtown via the State Street subway, then going southwest on the Orange Line and north along Ashland, before re-joining the subway at North/Clybourn or Clark/Division. The Circle Line would connect several different Metra lines with the "L" system, and would facilitate transfers between existing CTA lines; these connections would be situated near the existing Metra and "L" lines' maximum load points. CTA initiated official "Alternatives Analysis" planning for the Circle Line in 2005. The Circle Line concept garnered significant public interest and media coverage.

Early conceptual planning divided the Circle Line into three segments. Phase 1 would be a restoration of the dilapidated "Paulina Connector", a short  track segment that links Ashland/Lake with Polk. This track section has since been restored and service on the 54th/Cermak branch was transferred to the Pink Line. Phase 2 would link 18th on the Pink Line to Ashland on the Orange Line, with a new elevated structure running through a large industrial area. Phase 3, the final phase, would link Ashland/Lake to North/Clybourn with a new subway running through the dense neighborhoods of West Town and Wicker Park. With the completion of all three phases, the perimeter area would be served by Circle Line trains.

In 2009, CTA released the results of its Alternatives Analysis Screen 3, in which it decided to begin early engineering work on Phase 2, due to its simple alignment through unpopulated areas and its relatively low cost (estimated to be $1.1 billion). Preliminary engineering work was performed on Phase 2. In addition to the new line, CTA planned to build four new stations as part of Phase 2. Three out of the four would be located along existing lines that the Circle Line will utilize. These would be at 18th/Clark, Cermak/Blue Island, Roosevelt/Paulina, and Congress/Paulina.

18th/Clark would be along the Orange Line in the Chinatown neighborhood, and would include a direct transfer connection to the Cermak/Chinatown station on the Red Line. Cermak/Blue Island would be located on the newly built elevated tracks in the Pilsen neighborhood. Roosevelt/Paulina would be located on the Pink Line in the Illinois Medical District. Congress/Paulina would be built above the Eisenhower Expressway, with a direct transfer connection to the Illinois Medical District station on the Blue Line. Existing stations would provide service near the United Center.

Phase 3 was not implemented, and planning stopped after 2009. Phase 3 ran through dense residential areas, so alignment must be considered carefully to avoid adversely impacting those neighborhoods. CTA estimated that Phase 3 would be far more costly than Phase 2 due to its being underground. After a number of alternate plans were evaluated, in 2009, CTA adopted the "locally preferred alternative" (LPA), which stopped Circle Line work after Phase 2, and Phase 3 was relegated to a "long term vision".

Orange Line extension 
A proposed extension of the Orange Line would have provided transit service from the current terminus, Midway International Airport, to the Ford City Mall, which was originally meant to be the Orange Line's southern terminus when the line was planned in the 1980s. This would have alleviated congestion at the current Midway terminal. CTA presented its locally preferred alternative at meetings in 2009. This consisted of a new elevated rail line that would have run south from the Midway terminal along Belt Railway tracks, crossing the Clearing Yard while heading southwest to Cicero Avenue, then would have run south in the median of Cicero to a terminal on the east side of Cicero near 76th Street. Basic engineering, along with an environmental impact statement, were underway in 2010. This extension was canceled.

Yellow Line extension 
A proposed extension of the Yellow Line would have provided transit service from the current terminus, at Dempster Street, to the corner of Old Orchard Road and the Edens Expressway, just west of the Westfield Old Orchard shopping center. CTA presented its locally preferred alternative at meetings in 2009. This consisted of a new elevated rail line from Dempster north along a former rail right-of-way to the Edens Expressway, where the line would have turned to the north and run along the east side of the freeway to a terminus at Old Orchard Road.

Basic engineering, along with an environmental impact statement, were underway in 2010. Unlike extensions to the Red and Orange Lines, the Yellow Line extension had attracted significant community opposition from residents of Skokie, as well as parents of students at the Niles North High School, on whose land the new line would have been constructed. Residents and parents cited concerns about noise, visual pollution, and crime. As a result, the extension was canceled.

Canceled projects 

Numerous plans have been advanced over the years to reorganize downtown Chicago rapid transit service, originally with the intention of replacing the elevated Loop lines with subways. That idea has been largely abandoned as the city seems keen on keeping an elevated/subway mix. 

There have been continued calls to improve transit within the city's greatly enlarged central core. At present the "L" does not provide direct service between the Metra commuter rail terminals in the West Loop and Michigan Avenue, the principal shopping district, nor does it offer convenient access to popular downtown destinations such as Navy Pier, Soldier Field, and McCormick Place. Plans for the Central Area Circulator, a $700 million downtown light rail system meant to remedy this, were shelved in 1995 for lack of funding. An underground line running along the lake shore would connect some of the city's major tourist destinations, but this plan has not been widely discussed.

Recognizing the cost and difficulty of implementing an all-rail solution, the Chicago Central Area Plan was introduced. It proposes a mix of rail and bus improvements, the centerpiece of which was the West Loop Transportation Center. The top level would be a pedestrian mezzanine, buses would operate in the second level, rapid transit trains in the third level, and commuter/high-speed intercity trains in the bottom level. 

The rapid transit level would connect to the existing Blue Line subway at its north and south ends, making possible the "Blue Line loop", envisioned as an underground counterpart to the Loop elevated. Alternatively, this level might be occupied by the Clinton Street subway. Among other advantages, the West Loop Transportation Center would provide a direct link between the "L" and the city's two busiest commuter rail terminals, Ogilvie Transportation Center and Union Station.

The plan proposed transitways along Carroll Avenue, a former rail right-of-way north of the main branch of the Chicago River, and under Monroe Street in the Loop, which earlier transit schemes had proposed as rail routes. The Carroll Avenue route would provide faster bus service between the commuter stations and the rapidly redeveloping Near North Side, with possible rail service later. These new busways would tie into the bus level of the West Loop Transportation Center.

These are canceled projects, identified in various city and regional planning studies. CTA has not begun official studies of these expansions, so it is unclear whether they will ever be implemented, or simply remain as visionary projects.

Clinton Street subway 
It would run through the West Loop, connecting the Red Line near North/Clybourn to the Red Line again, near Cermak-Chinatown. From North/Clybourn, the subway would run south along Larrabee Street, then under the Chicago River to Clinton Street in the West Loop. Running south under Clinton, the subway would pass Ogilvie Transportation Center and Union Station, with short connections to Metra trains. It would then continue south on Clinton until 16th Street, where it would turn east, cross the river again, and rejoin the Red Line just north of the current Cermak-Chinatown stop. The estimated cost of this line was $3 billion, with no local funding source identified.

Airport Express 
Airport Express service to O'Hare International Airport and Midway International Airport to and from a downtown terminal on State Street. On the 3200 series cars, black Midway and O'Hare destination signs exist, suggesting a possible Airport Express service, since the sign used for Express trains is written in a black background. A business plan prepared for CTA called for a private firm to manage the venture with service starting in 2008. The project has been criticized as a boondoggle. 

The custom-equipped, premium-fare trains would offer nonstop service at faster speeds than the current Blue and Orange Lines. Although the trains would not run on dedicated rails (construction of such tracks could cost more than $1.5 billion), several short sections of passing track built at stations would allow the express trains to pass Blue and Orange trains while they sit at those stations. CTA has pledged $130 million and the city of Chicago $42 million toward the cost of the downtown station. 

In comments posted to her blog in 2006, CTA chair Carole Brown said, "I would support premium rail service only if it brought significant new operating dollars, capital funding, or other efficiencies to CTA… The most compelling reason to proceed with the project is the opportunity to connect the Blue and Red subway tunnels," which are one block apart downtown. In the meantime, CTA announced that due to cost overruns, it would only complete the shell of the Block 37 station; its president said "it would not make sense to completely build out the station or create the final tunnel connections until a partner is selected because final layout, technology and finishes are dependent on an operating plan."

Mid-City Transitway 

It would run around, rather than through the Chicago Loop. The line would follow the Cicero Avenue/Belt Line corridor (former Crosstown Expressway alignment) between the O'Hare branch of the Blue Line at Montrose and the Dan Ryan branch of the Red Line at 87th Street. It may be an "L" line, but busway and other options are being considered.

Security and safety 
Violent crime on the CTA has increased since the pandemic, and as of March 2, 2022, was up 17% compared to the year before. The CTA Union has called for conductors, which were dropped in 1997 to be brought back, while the city has promised more security guards.

CTA has had incidents where operators apparently overrode automatic train stops on red signals. These include the 1977 collision at Wabash and Lake, when four cars of a Lake-Dan Ryan train fell from the elevated structure, killing 11. There were two minor incidents in 2001, and two more in 2008, the more serious involving a Green Line train that derailed and straddled the split in the elevated structure at the 59th Street junction between the Ashland and East 63rd Street branches, and a minor one near 95th Street on the Red line. In 2014, the O'Hare station train crash occurred when a Blue Line train overran a bumper at the airport station and ascended up an escalator.

In 2002, 25-year-old Joseph Konopka, self-styled as "Dr. Chaos", was arrested by Chicago police for hoarding potassium cyanide and sodium cyanide in a Chicago Transit Authority storeroom in the Chicago "L" Blue Line subway. Konopka had picked the original locks on several doors in the tunnels, then changed the locks so that he could access the rarely used storage rooms freely.

Recent studies have highlighted the Belmont and 95th stops on the Red Line being the "most dangerous".

As of 2018, the Chicago Police Department (CPD)'s Public Transportation Unit, and the police departments of Evanston, Skokie, Forest Park, and Oak Park patrol the CTA system. The CPD provides random screenings for explosives. In addition, the CTA has its own K-9 patrol units and has installed more than 23,000 surveillance cameras.

From 2008 to 2019, there have been a total of 27 derailments. Most were minor, but some resulted in serious injuries for passengers.

On September 24, 2019, a Brown Line train collided with a Purple Line train near Sedgwick on the North Side Main Line during the morning rush hour. Fourteen injuries were reported and the cause is under investigation. According to the Chicago Fire Department, the injured were later found to be in stable condition. No derailments occurred. The CTA said service resumed about an hour after the incident.

On October 3, 2019, a train operating Pink Line service on the Cermak branch struck a car that had driven past and around the gates at the level crossing on 47th Avenue near Cermak Road. Six injuries were reported.

On June 7, 2021, a CTA Red Line train derailed near Bryn Mawr. 24 passengers were aboard. No injuries were reported.

In popular culture 
Movies and television shows use establishing shots to orient audiences to the location. For media set in Chicago, the "L" is a common feature because it is a distinctive part of the city.

Films 
Some of the more prominent films which have used such setup footage include:

 The Sting (1973)
 Cooley High (1975)
 Sheba, Baby (1975)
 The Blues Brothers (1980)
 The Hunter (1980)
 Risky Business (1983) features the "L" in several erotic sequences
 Code of Silence (1985)
 Ferris Bueller's Day Off (1986)
 Running Scared (1986) shows a car chase taking place on the "L" tracks. The sounds of the "L" are also distinctive and are therefore also used to establish location
 Adventures in Babysitting (1987)
 Planes, Trains and Automobiles (1987)
 Child's Play (1988)
 Above the Law (1988)
 Only the Lonely (1991)
 Rapid Fire (1992)
 Straight Talk (1992)
 The Fugitive (1993), which also contained a short scene inside of an "L" train
 While You Were Sleeping (1995) includes a main character, Lucy, who works as an "L" fare collector
 Stir of Echoes (1999)
 On the Line (2001)
 Barbershop 2: Back in Business (2004)
 Spider-Man 2 (2004) features a sequence in which Doctor Octopus (Alfred Molina) and Spider-Man (Tobey Maguire) do battle on top of and briefly inside a New York subway train that strongly resembles the "L". Doc Ock eventually removes the train's controls and leaves Spider-Man to stop the derailing train, which he does, although at a great physical toll.
 Shall We Dance (2004), in which Richard Gere learns to dance with Jennifer Lopez by the light of the "L'
 Divergent features the "L" as the method of transportation around the city and plays a key role in certain situations. In Allegiant several of the main characters take the "L" to near the John Hancock Tower to scatter Tris' ashes. These films portray futuristic versions of current train models.

Television series 

 Dick Wolf's Chicago franchise of four TV shows is set in and filmed on site in the city, and features the "L" in various episodes.
 In the U.S. version of the TV series Shameless, set on the South Side of Chicago, several main characters take the "L" for transportation.
 On the CBS sitcom The Bob Newhart Show, which was set in Chicago, the opening credits sequence shows various CTA "L" trains.
 On the CBS sitcom Good Times, features the "L" in the opening and end credits.
 On the CBS sitcom Mike & Molly, an "L" train can be seen passing by Mike and Carl's preferred eatery, Abe's.
 Another CBS series, Early Edition, also features the "L" in its opening credits and in several scenes of its episodes.
 On the NBC medical drama ER, set in Chicago, the "L" is often shown.
 Disney Channel's family sitcom Raven's Home features the "L" in many establishing shots.
 On the ABC sitcom Family Matters set in Chicago, the "L" is featured in various episodes.

See also 

 List of metro systems
 Transportation in Chicago
 List of United States rapid transit systems by ridership

Notes

References

Further reading

External links 

 Chicago Transit Authority – operates CTA buses and "L" trains
 Ride the Rails – Interactive ride of the Chicago "L"
 Chicago-L.org – an unofficial, extensive fan site
 CTA Tattler  – Daily blog of "L" stories
 ForgottenChicago.com – Forgotten Chicago, "Our Historic Subway Stations".
 Network map (real-distance)
The world's longest subway platform – Chicago Aussie. (3:55)
SubwayNut – a site with photo essays of every station.

L
L
Rapid transit in Illinois
L
Standard gauge railways in the United States
L
Underground rapid transit in the United States
600 V DC railway electrification
Chicago "L"